Haydamaky may refer to:

 Haydamaks, 18th-century Ukrainian rebels against the Polish nobility
 Haydamaky (band), a Ukrainian folk-rock band formed in 1991
 Haydamaky (poem), an 1841 poem by Taras Shevchenko